The FreeX Gemini is a German two-place, paraglider that was designed and produced by FreeX of Egling in the mid-2000s. It is now out of production.

Design and development
The Gemini was designed as a tandem glider for flight training.

Like all FreeX wings it features internal diagonal bracing. The glider is DHV 1-2 Biplace certified.

Specifications (Gemini)

References

Gemini
Paragliders